Sir Hutchins Williams, 1st Baronet (c. 1700 – 4 November 1758) was an English gentleman. He was born in London, England, to William Peere Williams and Anne Hutchins. He was admitted to Gray's Inn in 1718, and matriculated at The Queen's College, Oxford in 1725. He was created a Baronet of Clapton, Northampton, on 4 April 1747.

Family 
On 18 March 1726 Hutchins married Judith Booth, daughter of James Booth. They had issue:

William Peere-Williams (c. 1730–1761)
Booth Williams (c. 1735–1784)
Ann Williams

References 
Burke, John, and Bernard Burke. A Genealogical and Heraldic History of the Extinct and Dormant Baronetcies of England, Ireland and Scotland. London: J.R. Smith, 1844.(p. 570) googlebooks Retrieved 7 February 2009.

Notes

Baronets in the Baronetage of Great Britain
1758 deaths